George Dunton Widener Jr. (March 11, 1889 - December 8, 1971) was an American businessman and thoroughbred racehorse owner; one of only five people ever designated "Exemplars of Racing" by the National Museum of Racing and Hall of Fame.

Early life
Widener was born into the prominent and wealthy Widener family of Philadelphia, Pennsylvania, he was the younger son of George Dunton Widener and Eleanor Elkins, and brother to Harry Elkins Widener (1885-1912) and Eleanor Widener Dixon (1891-1966).

His grandfathers, the traction (streetcar) magnate Peter A. B. Widener (1834-1915) and the oil & steel financier William Lukens Elkins (1832-1903), were long-time friends and business partners. At age 23, he lost both his father and brother when the RMS Titanic sank in the Atlantic on her maiden voyage on April 15, 1912.  His sister married Fitz Eugene Dixon in 1912.

Horse racing

Greatly influenced by his uncle Joseph E. Widener (1871–1943), head of New York's Belmont Park and builder of Hialeah Park racetrack in Miami, he became involved in thoroughbred horse racing.

In 1916, he began raising thoroughbreds at Erdenheim Farm, and at Old Kenney Farm (now Green Gates Farm) in Lexington, Kentucky.  In 1962, he sold the farm and later that same year, his colt, Jaipur, won the Travers Stakes, which had eluded him since 1918.  Jaipur, a sentimental favorite because of his owner and a betting favorite because of his promise, defeated Ridan by a nose.  While Jaipur was not a candidate for the Kentucky Derby, the first of the contests in the Triple Crown, he did win the Belmont Stakes.

From 1960 to 1968, Widener served as president of the National Museum of Racing and Hall of Fame.

Personal life
In 1917, he married divorcée Jessie (née Sloane) Dodge (1883-1968), daughter of Henry T. Sloane and Jessie Robbins of New York City, former wife of Willam Earl Dodge, and became stepfather to Diana Dodge.

George D. Widener Jr. died in 1971 at his Erdenheim Farm, in Whitemarsh Township, Pennsylvania, north of Philadelphia.  He left the farm and his personal fortune to his nephew, Fitz Eugene Dixon Jr.

Honors
The University of Pennsylvania School of Veterinary Medicine's George D. Widener Hospital for Large Animals at the New Bolton Center is named in his honor.

References

1889 births
1971 deaths
American sports businesspeople
American racehorse owners and breeders
American philanthropists
Businesspeople from Philadelphia
Widener family
Members of the Philadelphia Club
New York (state) Republicans
Pennsylvania Republicans
People from Cheltenham, Pennsylvania